Sandeep Yadav (born 15 December 1989) is an Indian cricketer. He made his List A debut on 16 October 2019, for Railways in the 2019–20 Vijay Hazare Trophy.

References

External links
 

1989 births
Living people
Indian cricketers
Railways cricketers
Place of birth missing (living people)